Oak Grove College is a coeducational special school and sixth form maintained by West Sussex County Council. The school provides special education for students with learning difficulties from Year 7 to Year 14. In late 2016 the school was awarded foundation level of the British Council’s International School Award in recognition of its work to bring the world into the classroom.

Ofsted
In 2014 the school received a 'good' rating following their Ofsted inspection.

References

External links
http://oakgrovecollege.org.uk/

Special schools in West Sussex
Community schools in West Sussex
Special secondary schools in England